R. Krishnasamy Naidu (Tamil:ரா.கிருஷ்ணசாமி நாயுடு; 5 January 1902 – 30 October 1973) was an Indian politician and former Member of Madras State Legislative Assembly (1952) and Member of the Legislative Assembly. He was elected to the Tamil Nadu legislative assembly as an Indian National Congress candidate from Srivilliputhur constituency in 1957 election and from Rajapalayam constituency in 1962 election.

An ardent social worker and a keen co-operator; Agriculturist ; interested in composing Tamil verses; and reading books and hearing carnatic music.

Joined in the Indian National Congress in 1922. Underwent imprisonment for one year in 1930 during the Civil Disobedience Movement.

References 

Indian National Congress politicians from Tamil Nadu
1902 births
1973 deaths